The 2018 Bryant Bulldogs football team represented Bryant University during the 2018 NCAA Division I FCS football season. They were led by second-year head coach James Perry and played their home games at Beirne Stadium. They were a member of the Northeast Conference. They finished the season 6–5, 2–4 in NEC play to finish in a tie for fifth place.

On December 3, head coach James Perry resigned to become the head coach at Brown. He finished at Bryant with a two-year record of 12–10.

Previous season
The Bulldogs finished the 2017 season 6–5, 4–2 in NEC play to finish in a tie for second place.

Preseason

Award watch lists

NEC coaches poll
The NEC released their preseason coaches poll on July 24, 2018, with the Bulldogs predicted to finish in third place.

Preseason All-NEC team
The Bulldogs placed six players on the preseason all-NEC team.

Offense

Tom Kennedy – WR

Defense

Dillon Guthro – DL

Kevin Lazo – DL

Thomas Gostigan – LB

Special teams

Gavin Rowley – K

Jean Constant – RS

Schedule

Game summaries

New Haven

at Stony Brook

Marist

Robert Morris

at Duquesne

Central Connecticut

at Fordham

at Sacred Heart

at Saint Francis (PA)

Wagner

at Howard

References

Bryant
Bryant Bulldogs football seasons
Bryant Bulldogs football